The Federally Administered Tribal Areas (FATA;) was a semi-autonomous tribal region in north-western Pakistan that existed from 1947 until being merged with neighbouring province Khyber Pakhtunkhwa in 2018 with the Twenty-fifth Amendment to the Constitution of Pakistan passed by the Parliament as well as Provincial Assembly of KPK. It consisted of seven tribal agencies (districts) and six Frontier Regions, and were directly governed by Pakistan's federal government through a special set of laws called the Frontier Crimes Regulations. 

On 24 May 2018, the National Assembly of Pakistan voted in favour of an amendment to the Constitution of Pakistan for the FATA-KP merger which was approved by the Senate the following day. Since the change was to affect the province of Khyber Pakhtunkhwa, it was presented for approval in the Khyber Pakhtunkhwa Assembly on 27 May 2018, and passed with majority vote. On 28 May 2018, the President of Pakistan signed the FATA Interim Governance Regulation, a set of interim rules for FATA until it merges with Khyber Pakhtunkhwa within a timeframe of two years. The 25th Amendment received assent from President Mamnoon Hussain on 31 May 2018, after which FATA was officially merged with Khyber Pakhtunkhwa.

History 

Although the British never succeeded in completely calming unrest in the region, it served as a buffer from unrest in Afghanistan. The British Colonial Government attempted to control the population of the annexed tribal regions with the Frontier Crimes Regulations (FCR), which granted large amounts of power to local leaders along the North-West Frontier as part of the process of indirect rule. Due to "the extremely harsh, inhuman and discriminatory provisions" contained within the FCR, the legislation came to be known as the "black law."

Colonial period

In 1935–36, a Hindu-Muslim clash occurred over the eloping of a Hindu girl by a Muslim in Bannu. The tribesmen rallied around Mirzali Khan, a tribal leader in Waziristan, who was later given the title of "the Faqir of Ipi" by the British. Jihad was declared against the British. Mirzali Khan, with his huge lashkar (force), started a guerrilla warfare against the British forces in Waziristan.

In 1938, Mirzali Khan shifted from Ipi to Gurwek, a remote village in Waziristan on the Durand Line near Razmak, where he declared an independent state and continued the raids against the British forces. In June 1947, Mirzali Khan, along with his allies, including the Khudai Khidmatgars and members of the Provincial Assembly, declared the Bannu Resolution. The resolution demanded that the Pashtuns be given a choice to have an independent state of Pashtunistan, composing all Pashtun majority territories of British India, instead of being made to join Pakistan. However, the British Raj refused to comply with the demand of this resolution. After the creation of Pakistan in August 1947, Mirzali Khan and his followers refused to recognise Pakistan, and launched a campaign against Pakistan. They continued their guerilla warfare against the new nation's government. In 1950, they announced the creation of Pashtunistan as an independent nation. However, his popularity among the people of Waziristan declined over the years, with several jirgas in Waziristan deciding to support Pakistan.

After independence
The annexed areas continued to be governed through the Frontier Crimes Regulations after the creation of Pakistan in 1947, by the Dominion of Pakistan in 1947, and into the Islamic Republic of Pakistan in 1956.  Even in the 1970s travellers through the Khyber Pass, such as those taking the Hippie Trail, were warned to stay close to the road because the Pakistani government had no control over the adjacent lands.

According to the United States Institute of Peace, the character of the region underwent a shift beginning in the 1980s. Mujahideen entered to fight against the jirgas as allies of the CIA Operation Cyclone; both were opposed to forces of the Soviet Union prior to the fall of the Berlin Wall and collapse of Soviet Union.

In 2001, the Tehrik-e-Taliban militants began entering into the region. In 2003, Taliban forces sheltered in the Federally Administered Tribal Areas began crossing the border into Afghanistan, attacking military and police after the United States invasion. Shkin, Afghanistan is a key location for these frequent battles. This heavily fortified military base has housed mostly American special operations forces since 2002 and is located six kilometers from the Pakistani border. It is considered the most dangerous location in Afghanistan.

Since the September 11 attacks in the United States of 2001, the tribal areas are a major theatre of militancy and terrorism. The Pakistan Army launched 10 operations against the Pakistani Taliban since 2001, most recently Operation Zarb-e-Azb in North Waziristan. The operations have displaced about two million people from the tribal areas, as schools, hospitals, and homes have been destroyed in the war. On 2 March 2017, the federal government considered a proposal to merge the tribal areas with Khyber Pakhtunkhwa, and to repeal the Frontier Crimes Regulations. However, some political parties have opposed the merger, and called for the tribal areas to instead become a separate province of Pakistan.

With the encouragement of the United States, 80,000 Pakistani troops entered the Federally Administered Tribal Areas in March 2004 to search for al-Qaeda operatives. They were met with fierce resistance from Pakistani Taliban. It was not the elders, but the Pakistani Taliban who negotiated a truce with the army, an indication of the extent to which the Pakistani Taliban had taken control. Troops entered the region, into South Waziristan and North Waziristan, eight more times between 2004 and 2006, and faced further Pakistani Taliban resistance. Peace accords entered into in 2004 and 2006 set terms whereby the tribesmen in the area would stop attacking Afghanistan, and the Pakistanis would halt major military actions against the Federally Administered Tribal Areas, release all prisoners, and permit tribesmen to carry small guns. 
On 4 June 2007, the National Security Council of Pakistan met to decide the fate of Waziristan and take up a number of political and administrative decisions to control "Talibanization" of the area. The meeting was chaired by President Pervez Musharraf and it was attended by the Chief Ministers and Governors of all four provinces. They discussed the deteriorating law and order situation and the threat posed to state security. To crush the armed militancy in the Tribal regions and Khyber-Pakhtunkhwa, the government decided to intensify and reinforce law enforcement and military activity, take action against certain madrasas, and jam illegal FM radio stations.

Merger with Khyber Pakhtunkhwa
On 24 January 2017, the federal government decided to merge FATA with Khyber Pakhtunkhwa, requiring legislation managed in Parliament after approval from the federal cabinet. Prime Minister Nawaz Sharif was to apprise the ministers of the merger issue in upcoming federal cabinet meetings. After approval for this merger, the Law Ministry would be asked to prepare the draft of the bill that would be presented in parliament for approval.

The JUI-F, a major ally and coalition partner of the ruling PML (N), opposed this move on various political grounds. The Pakhtunkhwa Mili Awami Party led by Mehmood Achakzai also opposed the merger.

Under the plan, FATA was to be put under the control of the provincial government through amendments to the Frontier Crimes Regulation (FCR). An annual grant of Rs100 billion was proposed for FATA's development under the proposed merger and the amount will be given from the Federal Divisible Pool.

Most political parties in Pakistan supported the demand of the merger of FATA with Khyber Pakhtunkhwa, including Pakistan Tehreek-e-Insaf (PTI), Pakistan People's Party (PPP), Qaumi Watan Party (QWP) and Jamaat-e-Islami Pakistan (JI).

The FATA Reforms Committee proposed in 2016 a set of "parallel and concurrent" political, administrative, judicial and security reforms, as well as a massive reconstruction and rehabilitation programme, to prepare FATA for merger with Khyber Pakhtunkhwa.

The proposed merger was near finalized at a meeting presided over by President Mamnoon Hussain at the Presidency in January 2017. The Prime Minister gave approval after discussing the issue with all the stakeholders. By March 2017, the federal cabinet approved the merger of FATA with Khyber Pakhtunkhwa and other reforms.

National Implementation Committee on FATA Reforms

On 18 December 2017, the National Implementation Committee (NIC) on FATA Reforms, chaired by Prime Minister Shahid Khaqan Abbasi, endorsed the FATA-Khyber Pakhtunkhwa merger and agreed to let FATA elect 23 members to the Khyber Pakhtunkhwa Assembly in the July 2018 general elections. The NIC also decided to remove controversial sections of the Frontier Crimes Regulations and to allow colonial-era regulation to continue with a sunset clause to be replaced entirely once a proper judicial system is in place in the tribal region.

Constitutional amendment

On 24 May 2018, the National Assembly of Pakistan passed a bill to enact the Twenty-fifth Amendment to the Constitution of Pakistan which calls for the merger of FATA with the province of Khyber Pakhtunkhwa. The vote was 229–1 in favor of the amendment. Jamiat Ulema-e-Islam-Fazal and Pakhtunkhwa Milli Awami Party lawmakers walked out from the assembly ahead of the vote. The sole dissenter was Dawar Kundi of the PTI.

On 25 May 2018, Twenty-fifth Amendment to the Constitution of Pakistan was passed with a majority in the Senate of Pakistan. A total of 69 votes was needed for the bill to be approved; the vote was 71–5 in favor of the amendment for FATA, K-P merger.

On 27 May 2018, Thirty-first Amendment to the Constitution of Pakistan was passed with a majority in the Khyber Pakhtunkhwa Assembly. A total of 83 votes was needed for the bill to be approved, the vote was an 87–7 in favor of the amendment for FATA, K-P merger.

Qabailistan proposal

Parliamentarians from tribal areas took strong exception to a resolution adopted by the Khyber Pakhtunkhwa assembly asking for merger of the Federally Administered Tribal Areas with their province. The Awami National Party also made similar demands that the FATA be merged with Khyber Pakhtunkhwa. These proposals were opposed by tribal parliamentarians in Islamabad.  The name Qabailistan was proposed for FATA as a new province separate from Khyber Pakhtunkhwa. The Qabailistan proposal never got any traction and was dropped in favor of merging FATA into Khyber Pakhtunkhwa province.

Geography 

The Federally Administered Tribal Areas were bordered by: Afghanistan to the north and west, Khyber Pakhtunkhwa to the east, and Balochistan to the south.

The seven Tribal Areas lay in a north-to-south strip that is adjacent to the west side of the six Frontier Regions, which also lie in a north-to-south strip. The areas within each of those two regions are geographically arranged in a sequence from north to south. The geographical arrangement of the seven Tribal Areas in order from north to south was:
Bajaur, Mohmand, Khyber, Orakzai, Kurram, North Waziristan, South Waziristan.
The geographical arrangement of the six Frontier Regions in order from north to south was:
FR Peshawar, FR Kohat, FR Bannu, FR Lakki Marwat, FR Tank, FR Dera Ismail Khan.

Demographics 

The total population of the Federally Administered Tribal Areas was estimated in 2000 to be about 3,341,080 people, or roughly 2% of Pakistan's population. Only 3.1% of the population resides in established townships. It is thus the most rural administrative unit in Pakistan. According to 2011 estimates FATA gained 62.1% population over its 1998 figures, totaling up to 4,452,913. This was the fourth-highest increase in population of any province, after that of Balochistan, Sindh and Gilgit-Baltistan.

Languages
According to the 2017 census of Pakistan, 98.4% of the population of FATA had Pashto as mother tongue, followed by 0.49% Urdu, 0.28% Punjabi, 0.10% Sindhi and 0.08% spoke Balochi.

Religions

Over 99.6% of the population is Muslim belonging to the Sunni Hanafi Fiqh.

According to a report by the government of Pakistan there were around 50,000 religious minority members living in former FATA region.These include 20,000 Sikh, 20,000 Christians and 10,000 Hindus.

Government and politics

Democracy and parliamentary representation 
In 1996, the Government of Pakistan finally granted the Federally Administered Tribal Areas the long requested "adult franchise", under which every adult would have the right to vote for their own representatives in the Parliament of Pakistan. The Federally Administered Tribal Areas were not allowed to organize political parties. Islamist candidates were able to campaign through mosques and madrasas, as a result of which mullahs were elected to represent the Federally Administered Tribal Areas in the National Assembly in 1997 and 2002. This was a departure from prior tribal politics, where power was focused in the hands of secular authorities, Maliks.

Women and elections 
All of the FATA's adults were legally allowed to vote in the Majlis-e-Shoora of Pakistan under the "adult franchise" granted in 1996. Stephen Tierney, in Accommodating National Identity, reported that women came out to do so in the thousands for the 1997 office, possibly motivated by competition for voter numbers among the tribes. However, Ian Talbot in Pakistan, a Modern History states that elders and religious leaders attempted to prevent female participation by threatening punishment against tribesmen whose women registered, leading to under-registration in the female population. In 2008, the Taliban ordered women in the FATA regions of Bajaur, Kurram and Mohmand against voting under threat of "serious punishment," while Mangal Bagh, chief of the Lashkar-e-Islam, forbade women to vote in the Jamrud and Bara subdivisions of the Khyber Agency.

Administration 

The region was controlled by the Federal government of Pakistan for more than seventy years until its merger with Khyber Pakhtunkhua. On behalf of the President, the Governor of Khyber Pakhtunkhwa (formerly NWFP) used to exercise the federal authority in the context of the Federally Administered Tribal Areas.

The Constitution of Pakistan had special provisions to rule the FATA.  The rules which were framed by the British in 1901 as Frontier Crimes Regulations (FCR) also continued to operate. According to now repealed Article 247 of Constitution of Pakistan, The Jurisdiction of the Supreme Court of Pakistan and any of the High Court of Pakistan did not extend to FATA and Provincially Administered Tribal Areas (PATA). The Khyber-Pakhtunkhwa Provincial Assembly had no power in FATA, and can exercise its powers in PATA only for that which was part of Khyber-Pakhtunkhwa.

The Pashtun tribes who inhabit the areas were semi-autonomous, The tribes have cordial relations with the Pakistan government.

Relations with the Pakistani Military
In 2001, the Pakistani military entered the Federally Administered Tribal Areas for the first time which was previously governed by Frontier Corps. In 2010, The New America Foundation and Terror Free Tomorrow conducted the first comprehensive public opinion survey in the Federally Administered Tribal Areas. The results showed that, on the issue of fighting militancy in the region, the people of the Federally Administered Tribal Areas overwhelmingly support the Pakistani military. Nearly 70 percent back the Pakistani military pursuing Al-Qaeda and Taliban fighters in the Tribal Areas. According to a survey, when asked how the Federally Administered Tribal Areas should be governed, 79 percent said it should be governed by the Pakistani military.

In 2014, about 929,859 people were reported to be internally displaced from North Waziristan as a result of Operation Zarb-e-Azb, a military offensive conducted by the Pakistan Armed Forces along the Durand Line.

Administrative divisions 

The Federally Administered Tribal Areas (FATA) consisted of two types of areas i.e. Tribal Agencies (Tribal Districts) and Frontier Regions (FRs). There were seven Tribal Agencies and six Frontier Regions.

Tribal Agencies
The Tribal Agencies were (from North to South): 
Bajaur Agency
Mohmand Agency
Khyber Agency
Orakzai Agency
Kurram Agency
North Waziristan Agency
South Waziristan Agency

Agencies were further divided into Subdivisions, and Tehsils. According to the Election Commission of Pakistan, the Federally Administered Tribal Areas consisted of the following subdivisions and tehsils:

Frontier Regions

The Frontier Regions were named after their adjacent settled Districts in Khyber-Pakhtunkhwa. The administration of the FR was carried out by the DCO / DC of the neighbouring named district. The overall administration of the frontier regions was carried out by the FATA Secretariat, based in Peshawar and reporting to the Governor of Khyber-Pakhtunkhwa. The six regions were:
Frontier Region Bannu
Frontier Region Dera Ismail Khan
Frontier Region Kohat
Frontier Region Lakki Marwat
Frontier Region Peshawar
Frontier Region Tank

Economy 

The people of Former FATA region are the most impoverished part of the nation. Despite being home to 2.4% of Pakistan's population, it makes up only 1.5% of Pakistan's economy with a per capita income of only $663 in 2010 only 34% of households managed to rise above the poverty level.

Due to the Former FATA region's tribal organization, the economy is chiefly pastoral, with some agriculture practiced in the region's few fertile valleys. Its total irrigated land is roughly 1,000 square kilometres. The region is a major center for opium trafficking, as well the smuggling of other contraband.

Foreign aid to the region is a difficult proposition, according to Craig Cohen, an analyst at the Center for Strategic and International Studies in Washington, D.C. Since security is difficult, local nongovernmental organizations are required to distribute aid, but there is a lack of trust amongst NGOs and other powers that hampers distribution. Pakistani NGOs are often targets of violent attacks by Islamist militants in the Former FATA region. Due to the extensive hostility to any hint of foreign influence, the American branch of Save the Children was distributing funding anonymously in the region as of July 2007. The concept of setting up Reconstruction Opportunity Zones (ROZs) in the former FATA region and Afghanistan was an element in the United States Government's counter-terrorism and regional economic integration strategies.

Social issues

Health 

There is one hospital bed for every 2,179 people in the former FATA region, compared to one in 1,341 in Pakistan as a whole. There is one doctor for every 7,670 people compared to one doctor per 1,226 people in Pakistan as a whole. 43% of the former FATA region's citizens have access to clean drinking water. Much of the population is suspicious about modern medicine, and some militant groups are openly hostile to vaccinations.

In June 2007, a Pakistani doctor was blown up in his car "after trying to counter the anti-vaccine propaganda of an imam in Bajaur", Pakistani officials told The New York Times.

Education 
The Former FATA region has a total of 6,050 government education institutions out of which 4,868 are functional. Out of these 4,868 functional institutions, 77 percent (3,729) are primary schools. Total enrolment in government institutions is 612,556 out of which 69 percent are studying at primary stage. Total number of working teachers in FATA is 22,610 out of which 7,540 are female. The survival rate from Grade KG to Grade 5 is 36 percent while the transition rate from primary to middle in public schools in Ex-FATA is 64 percent (73 percent for boys and 45 percent for girls).

The Former FATA region has one university, FATA University in Akhurwal, Darra Adam Khel, FR Kohat, which was approved by Mir Hazar Khan Khoso in May 2013. Classes commenced on 24 October 2016, under the direction of Dr. Mohammad Tahir Shah, former professor of geology at University of Peshawar. The university plans to open sub-campuses at Khar, Miran Shah, and Parachinar.

The Former FATA region's literacy rate is 22%, which is well below the nationwide rate of 56%. 35.8% of men, and only 7.5% of women receive education, compared to a nationwide 44% of women.

Sports 
FATA is home to the domestic cricket team FATA Cheetahs. The Federally Administered Tribal Areas cricket team gained first class status in 2015.

See also

Administrative System of the FATA
Economy of the Federally Administered Tribal Areas
 Frontier Regions
Provincially Administered Tribal Areas (PATA)
Twenty-fifth Amendment to the Constitution of Pakistan

References

External links 

Constitutional Provisions on the Tribal Areas – Chapter 3, Part XII of the Constitution of Pakistan
FATA Secretariat Official Website
FATA  Guide.
FATA Development Authority Official Website 

 
Subdivisions of Pakistan
Former subdivisions of Pakistan
Belt regions
Pashto-speaking countries and territories
Durand Line
States and territories established in 1970
States and territories disestablished in 2018
2010s disestablishments in Pakistan